Norman Geschwind (January 8, 1926 – November 4, 1984) was a pioneering American behavioral neurologist, best known for his exploration of behavioral neurology through disconnection models based on lesion analysis.

Early life
Norman Geschwind was born on January 8, 1926, in New York City, New York to a Jewish family. He was a student at Boy's High School in Brooklyn, New York. He matriculated into Harvard University in 1942, initially planning to study mathematics. His education was interrupted when drafted into the Army in 1944. After serving for two years, he returned to Harvard University in 1946. Geschwind changed to the Department of Social Relations and studied a combination of social/personality psychology and cultural anthropology. Geschwind later married and had three children, Naomi, David, and Claudia.

Medical education and training
Geschwind attended Harvard Medical School, intending to become a psychiatrist. His emphasis began to shift after studying neuroanatomy with Marcus Singer, at which time he began to develop an interest in aphasia and epilepsy. He graduated medical school in 1951. Geschwind continued his studies at London's National Hospital, Queen Square, as a Moseley Travelling Fellow from 1952 to 1953, then as a United States Public Health Service fellow from 1953 to 1955. He studied with Sir Charles Symonds who taught the importance of neurologic mechanisms to studying disorders.

In 1955, Geschwind became neurology chief resident at the Boston City Hospital and served under Derek Denny-Brown. From 1956 to 1958 he was a research fellow studying muscle disease at the MIT Department of Biology.

Geschwind joined the Neurology Department of the Boston Veterans Administration Hospital in 1958, where he met Fred Quadfasel, chief of neurology for the department. At this time, his clinical interest in aphasia developed into his lifelong study of the neurological basis of language and higher cognitive functions. Quadfasel encouraged Geschwind to study classic texts of neurology from the 19th and early 20th century, exposing him to classic localizationist theory.

Career
Geschwind became Chief of Neurology at the Boston VA Hospital in 1962, and an Associate Professor in Neurology at Boston University. Geschwind with Edith Kaplan established in the early 1960s at the Boston VA the Boston University Aphasia Research Center. The Aphasia Research Center would go on to become a pioneer in interdisciplinary aphasia research, including luminaries like Harold Goodglass. Geschwind ended his tenure as chief of neurology at the VA in 1966 and became Chair of the Department of Neurology at Boston University for 1966–68.

In 1969, he was chosen as Harvard Medical School's James Jackson Putnam Professor of Neurology, a position previously held by his old mentor, Derek Denny-Brown. At Harvard he continued to research aphasia and epilepsy, as well as dyslexias, the neuroanatomy of cerebral lateral asymmetries, and other areas of neurological dysfunction. Geschwind was noted for his inspirational teaching of medical students, residents, and fellows. He also supported an interdisciplinary approach to research. He significantly shaped the neurological climate in the US and Europe during his life, an influence which lives on in his students.

Geschwind is credited with coining the term behavioral neurology in the 1970s to describe the corpus of course material in the area of higher cortical functions starting to be presented at American Academy of Neurology meetings. He also credited with the discovery of Geschwind syndrome, which describes an interictal behavior pattern seen in some temporal lobe epileptics.

In later years, Geschwind worked with a number of neurologists to whose future research careers in behavioral neurology he gave significant direction; among these were Albert Galaburda, Kenneth Heilman, Elliott Ross, and David N. Caplan. He actively encouraged and supported interdisciplinary research.

Geschwind would remain at Harvard Medical School until his premature death on November 4, 1984, aged 58.

Legacy
Several of his trainees went on to train other neurologists in behavioral neurology, including Albert Galaburda, D. Frank Benson, Antonio Damasio, Marsel Mesulam, Kenneth Heilman, and Elliott Ross.

The Norman Geschwind Award in Behavioral Neurology is presented through the American Academy of Neurology and the Society for Behavioral and Cognitive Neurology yearly in honor of Geschwind. The Norman Geschwind-Rodin Prize is a Swedish award for research in dyslexia.

Neurological eponyms include Geschwind syndrome and the Geschwind–Galaburda hypothesis.

Geschwind's former trainees and colleagues collaborated on a book in his memory, and two of his nephews, Daniel Geschwind and Michael Geschwind, have become prominent in the field of neurology.

References

Bibliography

External links
Norman Geschwind papers, 1872-2009 (inclusive), 1968-1984 (bulk). H MS c435. Harvard Medical Library, Francis A. Countway Library of Medicine, Boston, Mass.

American neurologists
20th-century American psychologists
Neuropsychologists
American cognitive neuroscientists
Jewish American scientists
Harvard Medical School alumni
Harvard Medical School faculty
Dyslexia researchers
1926 births
1984 deaths
20th-century American physicians
People from New York City
20th-century American Jews